St Cathan's Chapel is a ruined chapel on the island of Colonsay, Scotland in the Inner Hebrides. It was dedicated to Cathan, an obscure saint once venerated across the western Scottish islands.

The ruins, which date to the pre-Reformation period, perhaps to the 14th century, stand within a walled graveyard which is still used. The structure was built on the site of an even earlier chapel, no trace of which survives. An object thought to be the chapel's holy water font was found and moved to Scalasaig, where it is now used  as a baptismal font in the local parish church.

Citations

External links

Archaeological sites in the Southern Inner Hebrides
Colonsay
Holy wells in Scotland